Luangeni is a constituency of the National Assembly of Zambia. It covers part of Chipata District in Eastern Province.

List of MPs

References

Constituencies of the National Assembly of Zambia
1973 establishments in Zambia
Constituencies established in 1973